Lophoruza mascarena is a moth of the family Noctuidae first described by Joseph de Joannis in 1910. It is found on Mauritius and Réunion.

Afromoths gives this name as a synonym of Lophoruza affulgens (Saalmüller, 1881).

Its basic colour is dark brown with a transversal clear-brown/beige stripe. Its wingspan is 24 mm for females and 21 mm for males.

References

External links
 "Lophoruza mascarena Joannis, 1910". Lépidoptères de La Réunion. With images.

Moths described in 1910
Acontiinae
Moths of Mauritius
Moths of Réunion